Huang Che-ming (born 12 June 1972) is a Taiwanese football (soccer) manager and former player. In 1990, after graduating from senior high school, he joined Taiwan Power Company F.C. (Taipower), in which he was one of the members achieving the club's ten consecutive league championships. In Taipower, he had played several different positions, from striker, midfielder, to center back. Nevertheless, his best position was center forward. He had been main goalscorer in the Chinese Taipei national football team and the futsal team. He retired from player career in 2004.

Huang had managed women's football team of Chung San Industrial and Commercial School. Now he is one of the coaches of Taipower.

International goals

Honours
 With Taiwan Power Company F.C.
 National First Division Football League
 Champions: 1994, 1995, 1996, 1997, 1998, 1999, 2000–01, 2001–02, 2002–03, 2004
 Runners-up: 1993
 CTFA Cup
 Champions: 1997, 2000, 2002

References

1972 births
Living people
Taiwan Power Company F.C. players
Taiwanese football managers
Taiwanese footballers
Taiwanese men's futsal players
Association football forwards